Casqui was a Native American polity visited in 1541 by the Hernando de Soto expedition. This group inhabited fortified villages in eastern Arkansas.

The tribe takes its name from the chieftain Casqui, who ruled the tribe from its primary village, thought to be located in present day Cross County, Arkansas near the town of Parkin.  The suspected site is the focal point of the Parkin Archeological State Park and it has been determined that the site was continuously occupied for at least 500 years. Information about Chief Casqui and his people comes from journals made during the expedition of Hernando de Soto in 1541.

Hernando de Soto Expedition
When de Soto's expedition arrived in the area the Casqui walked over a mile from their village to greet the travelers and invite them to stay in the town.  The travelers declined the offer and made camp outside of the village.  The journals report that de Soto gave a speech to the Casqui about religion and baptized several of the villagers as Christians.  The journals report that the villagers helped them erect a large wooden cross on the central mound.

When de Soto determined to press on and visit the nearby tribe called the Pacaha many of the Casqui people followed him.  The Casqui and the Pacaha had been at war for some time and the Casqui had raided the Pacaha on previous occasions. When de Soto and the Casqui approached, many of the Pacaha became afraid and attempted to flee to an island in the river and drowned. The Casqui who had followed de Soto proceeded to sack the village, desecrate holy sites, and steal everything they could.

De Soto contacted Chief Pacaha and convinced him that he had nothing to do with the attack and that the expedition's intentions were peaceful. De Soto even assured the Pacaha that the expedition would help the Pacaha attack the Casqui to punish them for their subterfuge.

The Casqui received advance warning of the planned attack and returned the looted items to the Pacaha and issued an apology in order to stave off retribution. De Soto arranged a dinner for the two leaders and arranged a peace treaty between the tribes.

The Hernando de Soto expedition records are the only historical records of Chief Casqui and his tribe. Their later history is uncertain.

In recent years a Spanish trade bead which matches descriptions of the seven-layer glass beads carried by the expedition has been found at the Parkin site as well as two Spanish falconer's bells, and Spanish musket balls.

See also
 Tunica people
 List of sites and peoples visited by the Hernando de Soto Expedition
 Pacaha
 Mississippian culture

References

External links 
National Park Service on de Soto's expedition
European Explorers in Arkansas
Website on alternate theory

Late Mississippian culture
Native American history of Arkansas
Native American tribes in Arkansas
Indigenous peoples of the Southeastern Woodlands
Former chiefdoms in North America